Giovanni Francesco Grimaldi (1606 – 28 November 1680) was an Italian painter, draughtsman, printmaker and architect.  He was an accomplished fresco painter of classical landscapes which were popular with leading Roman families.

Life
Grimaldi was born in Bologna, and trained in the circle of the Carracci family. He was afterwards a pupil of Cardinal Francesco Albani. He went to Rome, and was appointed architect to Pope Paul V and also patronized by succeeding popes. Towards 1648 he was invited to France by Cardinal Mazarin, and for about two years was employed in buildings for that minister and for Louis XIV, and in fresco-painting in the Louvre.

His colour was strong, somewhat excessive in the use of green; his touch light. He painted history, portraits and landscapes—the, last with predilection, especially in his advanced years—and executed engravings and etchings from his own landscapes and from those of Titian and the Caracci. Returning to Rome, he was made principe (director) of the Accademia di San Luca; and he died in Rome, having established a reputation for artistic skill and charitable actions.

His son Alessandro assisted him both in painting and in engraving. Paintings by Grimaldi are preserved in the Palazzo del Quirinale and in the Vatican, and in the church of San Martino ai Monti; there is also a series of his landscapes in the Palazzo Colonna. His mistress was Elena Aloisi, daughter of the painter Baldassare Aloisi.

References

Notes

Sources

External links

1606 births
1680 deaths
17th-century Italian painters
Architects from Bologna
Italian Baroque painters
Italian landscape painters
Italian male painters
Painters from Bologna